The Festival du Rhum Haiti (English: Haiti Rum Festival) is an international festival promoting rum and related alcoholic beverages organized by J'Organise; collaborated and held in the El Rancho Hotel in Pétion-Ville, Haiti. The three-day event premiered 14 November 2014.

Awards such as Gold, Silver and Bronze medals are awarded to best amateurs and professionals of rum and cocktails and even chefs for cooking demonstrations from the best around the world. At the closing ceremony of the event, includes artistic performances, and a fashion show.

See also
Rhum agricole
List of festivals in Haiti

References

External links 
Festival du Rhum Haiti Official Website

Alcoholic drinks
Food and drink festivals in Haiti
Alcohol in Haiti
2014 establishments in Haiti
Pétion-Ville
Recurring events established in 2014